Chen Weida (March 1916 – 1990) was a Chinese politician and educator.

Biography
Chen Weida was born in Xiangshui County, Jiangsu in 1916.  He joined the Communist Party of China in 1937.

After the foundation of the People's Republic of China, Chen Weida had been the Secretary of the CPC Hangzhou Committee, the First Secretary of the CPC Tianjin Committee, and the Deputy Secretary of the CPC Central Political and Legislative Affairs Committee.

Chen was the President of Zhejiang University from 1962 to 1968.

External links
 Chen Weida's profile, Zhejiang University website.
 Biography of Chen Weida, Xiangshui County Government website.

1916 births
1990 deaths
People's Republic of China politicians from Jiangsu
Politicians from Yancheng
Academic staff of Zhejiang University
Mayors of Tianjin
Political office-holders in Zhejiang
Chinese Communist Party politicians from Jiangsu
Presidents of Zhejiang University